Layman is a surname, and may refer to:

 Alfred Layman (1858–1940), English cricketer
 Charles Layman (1865–1926), Australian politician 
 George Layman (1838–1922), Australian legislator
 Florence Layman (1873-1930), American inventor
 Isaac Layman (born 1977), American photographer
 Jason Layman (born 1973), American football player
 John Layman (born 1969), American comic book writer
 Jake Layman (born 1994), American basketball player
 Sandy Layman, American politician 
 William Layman, HMS Raven (1804) commander

 A Layman, pen-name by Thomas Hughes and Sir Walter Scott
 Layman Brothers
 Layman Pang (740–808), celebrated lay Buddhist

See also
Laymon
Lejman